The Shoalwater Islands Marine Park is a protected marine park located in Western Australia and stretches from the northern point of the Garden Island Causeway to the southern point of Becher Point. The  marine park is located offshore from the suburban locality of Shoalwater.

Several small limestone islands are located within the boundaries of the park, including Penguin Island and Seal Island.

See also

 Protected areas of Western Australia
Islands of Perth, Western Australia

References

Further reading
Crane, Kevin, Carolyn Thomson and Peter Dans.(1995) Discovering Penguin Island and the Shoalwater Islands Marine Park. Como, W.A. Dept.of Conservation and Land Management. 
 Thomson-Dans, Carolyn.(2005) Shoalwater Islands Marine Park. Landscope (Como, W.A), Autumn 2005, p. 52-53.

External links

Marine parks of Western Australia
Shoalwater Marine Park